A posteriori (Latin, 'from the later') is a term used in philosophy and epistemology. 

A posteriori may refer to:
 A Posteriori, a 2006 music album by Enigma
 A posteriori knowledge, knowledge gained from empirical evidence
 A posteriori language, a type of constructed language
 A posteriori probability, a term with two uses in mathematics
 A posteriori (chess), a retrograde analysis convention

See also

 A priori (disambiguation)
 Posterior (disambiguation)
 Ex post
 Ex post facto law